The 2006 Calder Cup playoffs of the American Hockey League began on April 18, 2006. The sixteen teams that qualified, eight from each conference, played best-of-seven series for division semifinals, finals and conference finals.  The conference champions played a best-of-seven series for the Calder Cup. The Calder Cup Final ended on June 15, 2006 with the Hershey Bears defeating the Milwaukee Admirals four games to two to win the ninth Calder Cup in team history.

Milwaukee's Darren Haydar set an AHL post-season record by scoring 6 game-winning goals in a single playoff. Hershey's Frederic Cassivi tied an AHL record by recording 16 wins in one playoff. He also won the Jack A. Butterfield Trophy as AHL Playoff MVP.

Playoff seeds
After the 2005–06 AHL regular season, 16 teams qualified for the playoffs. The top four teams from each division qualified for the playoffs. However, it was possible for the fifth-placed team in the Atlantic Division to take the spot of the fourth-placed team in the East Division if they earned more points, since the East Division had one fewer team. This did not occur as the Bridgeport Sound Tigers, the fourth-placed team in the East Division finished with 85 points while the Lowell Lock Monsters, the fifth-placed team in the Atlantic Division, finished with 72 points. The Grand Rapids Griffins were the Western Conference regular season champions as well as the Macgregor Kilpatrick Trophy winners with the best overall regular season record. The Portland Pirates were the Eastern Conference regular season champions.

Eastern Conference

Atlantic Division
Portland Pirates – Eastern Conference regular season champions, 114 points
Hartford Wolf Pack – 104 points
Manchester Monarchs – 93 points
Providence Bruins – 92 points

East Division
Wilkes-Barre/Scranton Penguins –  113 points
Hershey Bears – 103 points
Norfolk Admirals – 94 points
Bridgeport Sound Tigers – 85 points

Western Conference

North Division
Grand Rapids Griffins – Western Conference regular season champions; Macgregor Kilpatrick Trophy winners, 115 points
Syracuse Crunch – 102 points
Manitoba Moose – 100 points
Toronto Marlies – 92 points

West Division
Milwaukee Admirals –  108 points
Houston Aeros – 106 points
Peoria Rivermen – 100 points
Iowa Stars – 90 points

Bracket

In each round the higher seed receives home ice advantage, meaning they can play a maximum of four home games if the series reaches seven games. There is no set series format for each series due to arena scheduling conflicts and travel considerations.

Division Semifinals
Note 1: Home team is listed first.

Eastern Conference

Atlantic Division

(A1) Portland Pirates vs. (A4) Providence Bruins

(A2) Hartford Wolf Pack vs. (A3) Manchester Monarchs

East Division

(E1) Wilkes-Barre/Scranton Penguins vs. (E4) Bridgeport Sound Tigers

(E2) Hershey Bears vs. (E3) Norfolk Admirals

Western Conference

North Division

(N1) Grand Rapids Griffins vs. (N4) Toronto Marlies

1 – Game played at Ricoh Coliseum
2 – Game played at Air Canada Centre

(N2) Syracuse Crunch vs. (N3) Manitoba Moose

West Division

(W1) Milwaukee Admirals vs. (W4) Iowa Stars

(W2) Houston Aeros vs. (W3) Peoria Rivermen

Division Finals

Eastern Conference

Atlantic Division

(A1) Portland Pirates vs. (A2) Hartford Wolf Pack

East Division

(E1) Wilkes-Barre/Scranton Penguins vs. (E2) Hershey Bears

Western Conference

North Division

(N1) Grand Rapids Griffins vs. (N3) Manitoba Moose

West Division

(W1) Milwaukee Admirals vs. (W2) Houston Aeros

Conference finals

Eastern Conference

(A1) Portland Pirates vs. (E2) Hershey Bears

Western Conference

(N1) Grand Rapids Griffins vs. (W1) Milwaukee Admirals

Calder Cup Final

(W1) Milwaukee Admirals vs. (E2) Hershey Bears

See also
2005–06 AHL season
List of AHL seasons

References

Calder Cup playoffs
Calder Cup